Historia is a compilation video released by Def Leppard containing all the band's promotional videos from 1980 to 1988. On DVD, it is bundled with Live: In the Round, in Your Face.

Track list
 "Hello America"
 "Let It Go"
 "High 'n' Dry (Saturday Night)"
 "Bringin' On the Heartbreak" (with Pete Willis)
 "Photograph"
 "Rock of Ages"
 "Foolin'"
 "Too Late for Love"
 "Rock! Rock! Till You Drop"
 "Bringin' On the Heartbreak" (with Phil Collen)
 "Me & My Wine"
 "Women"
 "Animal"
 "Pour Some Sugar on Me" (UK version, featuring the band Tesla in the crowd scene)
 "Hysteria"
 "Armageddon It" (live)
 "Pour Some Sugar On Me" (US version live)
 "Love Bites" (unlisted on VHS version)

 "Armageddon It" and "Pour Some Sugar on Me" (US version) are listed as live versions, but the videos are of a live performances accompanied by the studio album music tracks.

DVD errors

The 2001 DVD release contains errors not present on the original VHS and Laserdisc releases. According to sources close to the band, there are no plans to fix the errors at this time:

 The video for "Bringin' On the Heartbreak (with Phil Collen)" contains a repeat of the audio from "Bringin' On the Heartbreak (with Pete Willis)" instead of the normal, remixed audio.
 During "Pour Some Sugar On Me (UK Version)" the audio originally contained demolition sounds such as glass breaking and walls crumbling while the house they were performing in was torn down around them. The audio for the US version also originally contained audio clips of crowds cheering throughout most of the song. All those sounds have been removed from the DVD release.

VHS
Published in the U.K., Northern Ireland, Ireland, and Australia in 1988 by Bludgeon Riffola Ltd./Warner Bros. Music Ltd and in the Rest of the World by Bludgeon Riffola Ltd./Zomba Music Publishers Ltd. Was distributed across the U.K. by Channel 5 Video, a part of Polygram Music Video company. The back cover photograph featuring the band, was taken was by Ross Halfin. Video sleeve art direction was by Andie Aifix for Satori, who is also referenced as designer for the cover of Metallica: 'The Videos 1989-2004' on DVD.

Certifications
Historia

Historia/In the Round In Your Face

References

Def Leppard video albums
1988 video albums
Music video compilation albums
1988 compilation albums
Def Leppard compilation albums